Mayfield West is a suburb of Newcastle, New South Wales, Australia, located  from Newcastle's central business district. It is part of the City of Newcastle local government area.

History 
The Aboriginal people, in this area, the Awabakal, were the first people of this land. One of the first European settlers was John Laurie Platt.

References

Suburbs of Newcastle, New South Wales